Sean Keenan may refer to:

 Sean Keenan (actor) (born 1993), Australian actor
 Sean Keenan (American football) (born 1977), American football player
 Seán Keenan (died 1993), Irish republican from Derry, Northern Ireland